Yevgeny Ivanovich Paladiev Евгений Иванович Паладьев (May 12, 1948 – January 9, 2010) was an ice hockey player who played in the Soviet Hockey League. He was born in Ust-Kamenogorsk, Kazakh SSR, USSR.

Paladiev played for HC Spartak Moscow and was inducted into the Soviet Hockey Hall of Fame in 1969.

External links 
 Russian and Soviet Hockey Hall of Fame bio

1948 births
2010 deaths
Sportspeople from Oskemen
Kazakhstani ice hockey players
Soviet ice hockey players
HC Spartak Moscow players
Kazzinc-Torpedo players